Borrelia coriaceae is a species of spirochete bacteria and member of the genus Borrelia. Strains of this species have been isolated from the soft tick Ornithodoros coriaceus and from mule deer.

Pathogenicity
B. coriaceae is a suspected pathogen in cattle, in which it is suspected to cause abortion (specifically, epizootic bovine abortion). The species is also closely related to other Borrelia species known to cause relapsing fever in humans.

References

coriaceae
Bacteria described in 1987